The Neshanic River is a tributary of the South Branch Raritan River in central New Jersey in the United States. It is 11 miles long.

See also
List of rivers of New Jersey

References

External links
U.S. Geological Survey: NJ stream gaging stations

Tributaries of the Raritan River
Rivers of New Jersey
Rivers of Somerset County, New Jersey